Arachchige Nihal Galappaththi is a Sri Lankan politician and a member of the Parliament of Sri Lanka.

References

 

Sri Lankan Buddhists
Living people
1954 births
Members of the 10th Parliament of Sri Lanka
Members of the 11th Parliament of Sri Lanka
Members of the 12th Parliament of Sri Lanka
Members of the 13th Parliament of Sri Lanka
Members of the 15th Parliament of Sri Lanka
Janatha Vimukthi Peramuna politicians
United People's Freedom Alliance politicians